The 2009 World Youth Baseball Championship was an international baseball tournament scheduled to start on 15 August 2009. It was the 14th time the World Youth Cup has taken place. Taichung, Taiwan hosted the tournament and 12 nations competed, including defending champions Cuba.

Round 1

Group A

Group B
Panama was originally scheduled to participate in Group B of the tournament, but withdrew citing financial concerns. The International Baseball Federation (IBAF) announced that Hong Kong would be their replacements, shortly before the tournament was due to commence.

Round 2

Bottom four

Quarter-finals

Semi-finals

Final round

7th place

5th place

3rd place

Final

Final standings

Awards 
The IBAF announced the following awards at the completion of the tournament.

See also
 List of sporting events in Taiwan

References

External links
Official website

U-15 Baseball World Cup
World Youth Championship
World Youth Baseball Championship
World Baseball Championship
2009
World Youth Baseball Championship
Sport in Taichung